Oussama Sellami (born June 22, 1979 in Tunis) is a Tunisian football player who, as of 2013, is playing for Stade Tunisien.

He made his international debut for Tunisia on 15 November 2000 against Switzerland.

External links

Tunisian footballers
Tunisia international footballers
1979 births
Living people
Footballers from Tunis
Club Africain players
Stade Tunisien players
Tunisian Ligue Professionnelle 1 players

Association football midfielders